Lough Leane is the largest of the three lakes of Killarney, in County Kerry. The River Laune flows from the lake into the Dingle Bay to the northwest.

Etymology and history
The lake's name means "lake of learning" probably in reference to the monastery on Innisfallen, an island in the lake. Innisfallen was a centre of scholarship in the early Middle Ages, producing the Annals of Innisfallen and, according to legend, educating King Brian Boru.

Another historic site, the tower house Ross Castle sits on Ross Island in the lake. Ross Island is rich in copper. Archaeological evidence suggests the island has been mined since the time of the Bronze Age Beaker People.

Geography

It is also the largest body of fresh water in the region. It has become eutrophic as a result of phosphates from agricultural and domestic pollution entering Lough Leane Reedbed, an important habitat on the edge of Lough Leane. This nutrient enrichment has caused several algal blooms in recent years. The blooms have not yet had a severe effect on the lake's ecosystem. To prevent further pollution causing a permanent change in the lake's ecosystem, a review of land use in the catchment area is being carried out. Water quality in the lake appears to have improved since phosphates were removed from sewage in 1985.

Wildlife
Lough Leane is a habitat for the critically endangered blunt-snouted Irish char (Salvelinus obtusus) and Killarney shad (Alosa killarnensis).

See also 
 Eóganacht Locha Léin, a ruling sept in the area during the Middle Ages

References 

Lakes of County Kerry